Iridomyrmex continentis is a species of ant in the genus Iridomyrmex. Encountered most of the time in drier regions of Australia, it was described by Forel in 1907.

References

Iridomyrmex
Hymenoptera of Australia
Insects described in 1907